The Fu'an dialect is a dialect of Eastern Min, which is a branch of Min Chinese spoken mainly in the eastern part of Fujian Province, China.

The Fu'an dialect covers two city and three counties: Ningde, Fu'an, Shouning, Zhouning and Zherong County.

Phonology 
The Fu'an dialect has 18 initials, 50 rimes and 7 tones.

Initials

Rimes

Tones

Perseverative assimilation

Anticipatory assimilation

Tone sandhi 
The two-syllable tonal sandhi rules are shown in the table below (the rows give the first syllable's original citation tone, while the columns give the citation tone of the second syllable):

References

.

Eastern Min